Wolfartsweier is a village and a quarter of Karlsruhe, Baden-Württemberg, Germany. Its population is 3,068 (2020). It was first mentioned in 1261 AD under the name of "Wolvoldeswilere". The local church was first mentioned in 1329.  A small creek, called Wettersbach, runs through the village, but in an underground canal for most of its way. Wolfartsweier has a town hall, a Protestant and a catholic church and community centres, and a public outdoor swimming pool.

In 2002, a new creche, the "Katzenkindergarten", was built in the shape of a lying cat. (Architect Ayla Yöndel / Idea and concept Tomi Ungerer)

Wolfartsweier lost its independence in 1973 when it became part of Karlsruhe.

References

Karlsruhe
Boroughs of Karlsruhe